Two ships of the Royal Navy have borne the name HMS Junon, a French form of the goddess Juno, of Roman mythology:

  was a 36-gun fifth rate captured from the French in 1809, but retaken by them later that year.
  was a 38-gun fifth rate, previously the French . She was captured in 1810 and broken up in 1817.

See also
 

Royal Navy ship names